Calbiga, officially the Municipality of Calbiga, is a 4th class municipality in the province of Samar, Philippines. According to the 2020 census, it has a population of 23,310 people. The town is famous for the Langun-Gobingob Caves which is the largest cave system in the Philippines, reputed to be the second largest in Asia and the world's third largest karst formation.

History
In 1649, Calbiga was an annex or visita of Catbalogan; later in 1768, Calbiga was transferred to the jurisdiction of Umauas. All through Jesuit times, Calbiga remained a visita until 1772, when it had its first residential pastor, the Franciscan Fray Miguel Rico (de Jesus), O.F.M.. Calbiga was constituted as a separate unit under the advocacy of the Anunciacion.

In 1803, Fray Juan Caballero de Brozas, O.F.M. built a wooden church but in 1808, a typhoon destroyed this church and was rebuilt by the same Fray Brozas. By 1840, Brozas's second church was in bad state.

In 1853, Fray Francisco Moreno de Montalbanejo. O.F.M. had gathered enough material for a stone church. However, Redondo (1884, 217) that the church was wood roofed with thatch.

The Jesuits left no permanent architectural imprint in the town.

The present barrio "Binongto-an (meaning, "once a town) was the original Calbiga settlement. Legend - as recorded by Atty. Singzon - has it that the people of Calbiga originated from two brothers, Calpis and Bituan. Bituan established a village near the mouth of the river while Calpis stayed upstream the exact location of the town today. The descendants of Bituan later abandoned the coastal village to join the descendants of Calpis.

Geography

Barangays
Calbiga is politically subdivided into 41 barangays.

 Antol
 Bacyaran
 Beri
 Barobaybay
 Binanggaran
 Borong
 Bulao
 Buluan
 Caamlongan
 Calayaan
 Calingonan
 Canbagtic
 Canticum
 Daligan
 Guimbanga
 Hindang
 Hubasan
 Literon
 Lubang
 Mahangcao
 Macaalan
 Malabal
 Minata
 Otoc
 Panayuran
 Pasigay
 Patong
 Barangay 1 (Poblacion)
 Barangay 2 (Poblacion)
 Barangay 3 (Poblacion)
 Barangay 4 (Poblacion)
 Barangay 5 (Poblacion)
 Barangay 6 (Poblacion)
 Barangay 7 (Poblacion)
 Polangi
 Rawis
 San Ignacio
 San Mauricio
 Sinalangtan
 Timbangan
 Tinago

Climate

Demographics

Economy

Tourism
Langun-Gobingob Caves (Barangay Panayuran): The largest cave system in the Philippines, reputed to be the second largest in Asia and the world's third largest karst formation, is 7 km. long with an area of 900 square km. The area is composed of at least 12 interconnected caves. Locals believe that the caves are home to ancient primordial spirits and the spirits of Waray ancestors, making the caves one of the most sacred zones in Samar.

Lulugayan Falls and Rapids (Barangay Literon): Hundreds of waterfalls cascade down the 14-kilometer rapids from the source at Lake Kalidongan to the Calbiga River. The most majestic and panoramic is the Lulugayan Falls at Barangay Literon Correche. Approximately fifty meters wide, Lulugayan Falls has been dubbed by tourists as a Mini Niagara.

Kalidongan Lake (Barangay Caamlongan): The eternal spring—the mythical crater-like lake, 90–100 meters in diameter, lined with clean white limestone. Its clear, fresh water endlessly flows down the rapids, onto the Calbiga River and Maqueda Bay.

Maqueda Bay and Mangrove Forests: The richest spawning grounds in Eastern Visayas for Fish and crustaceans and one of the pillars of the island's economy.

Calbiga River: The river is the town's thriving lifeline. Small bancas daily go upstream and loaded with native merchandise. It serves 17 barangays as transport byway and water source.

Kanyawa Caves (Barangay Caamlongan): A little farther to the east is another huge caves system recently explored by French and Italian spelunkers. The caves system consists of fifteen galleries of distinctive features and underground rivers, and numerous stalactites and stalagmites.

Children's Play Area and Nature Park (Barangay Bacyaran): The first phase of the Calbiga Nature Park will also include a Visitor's Center, Multi-purpose Pavilion, Amphitheater, Boardwalk and many more.

Culture

The Calbiga Fiesta
The Evangelization of Calbiga
When the Jesuits established missions in the island of Samar in 1696, Calbiga was served as a visita by the Jesuit resident mission in Umauas. In 1768, the Franciscans took over the administration of Samar and. Soon after, in 1771, Calbiga was established as a parish appointing Fray Miguel Rico (de Jesus), O.F.M. as the first cura paroco. For lack of missionaries. Umauas was joined to Calbiga until separated by a decree on March 12, 1863, giving Umauas its present name, Villa-Real.

The Original Patrona
Calbiga was then under the patronage of Nuestra Señora de los Angeles (Our Lady, Queen of the Angels) and the town's special feast day was celebrated on August 2 even at the original settlement, Binongtoan, at the mouth of the Calbiga River. The transfer of the seacoast villagers to the upper part of the river, based on legend, was related to the miracles of the Virgin. Here's a Portion of the report submitted to the Historical Commission by the Alcalde Mayor Perfecto Hacbang in 1938: “We also have a sample of unexplained happenings as follows: at the time when the town was still in the place of Binongto-an, the patron saint, then Nuestra Señora de los Angeles, would disappear from its site and was always found afterwards in the place where the town is located today. It was one of the main reasons why the people moved to this town.” This story was corroborated by historian-writer Atty. Filomeno Singzon in his article La Historia de la Virgen de la Anuncacion.
The original wooden image of Nuestra Señora de los Angeles had a special niche beside the altar even after the antique church was demolished and replaced by concrete structure in the mid-Sixties, but during the finishing touches of its interiors, the “miraculous” image, together with some precious relics, the other santos, the silver candelabra, the other intricate wood carvings and the other “antiques” disappeared, never to be seen again.

From Nuestra Señora de los Angeles to Nuestra Señora de la Anuncacion
When Fray Juan Caballero de Brozas, O.F.M. built a strong wooden church in 1803, he dedicated it to Nuestra Senora de la Anuncacion (Our Lady of the Annunciation) whose feast day falls on March 25. But the Calbiganons continued to venerate the image of Nuestra Señora de los Angeles until it was replaced by a new image of a kneeling virgin with the Archangel Gabriel, during the hermanidad of Señora Mamerta Quimbo Abellar de Singzon sometime after the church was built and dedicated to Nuestra Señora de la Anuncacion in 1803.

Education
Calbiga Western Samar College
Eastern Visayas Regional Science High School- Annex
Calbiga National High School
Calbiga Central Elementary School
there are also other complete elementary and primary schools in some barangays.

References

External links

 Calbiga Profile at PhilAtlas.com
 [ Philippine Standard Geographic Code]
 Philippine Census Information
 Local Governance Performance Management System

 
Municipalities of Samar (province)